Hans Philipp August Albers (22 September 1891 – 24 July 1960) was a German actor and singer. He was the biggest male movie star in Germany between 1930 and 1960 and one of the most popular German actors of the twentieth century.

Early life 

Hans Albers was born in Hamburg, the son of a butcher, and grew up in the district of St. Georg. He was seriously interested in acting by his late teens and took acting classes without the knowledge of his parents. In 1915 Albers was drafted to serve in the German Army in World War I, but was wounded early on. After his release from the Hospital in Wiesbaden where he had been treated, he performed in the local Residenztheater in comedies, antics and operettas. After the war Albers moved to Berlin, where he found work as a comedic actor in various Weimar-Era Berlin theatres. His breakthrough performance was that of a waiter in the play Verbrecher (Criminals). It was also in Berlin that Albers began a long-term relationship with Jewish actress Hansi Burg (1898–1975). The relationship ended only when he died in 1960.

After roles in over one hundred silent films, Albers starred in the first German talkie Die Nacht gehört uns (The Night Belongs to Us) in 1929. Soon thereafter, Albers played big-mouthed strong man Mazeppa alongside Marlene Dietrich in her star-making classic Der blaue Engel (The Blue Angel). Albers himself shot to fame in 1930 with the movie The Copper and constantly enhanced his star status with similar daredevil roles in the 1930s. He was probably at his best when teamed-up with fellow German movie legend Heinz Rühmann, as in Bombs on Monte Carlo (1931) and Der Mann, der Sherlock Holmes war (1937). Many of Albers' songs from his movies became huge hits and some even remain popular to this day.

The 1930s and the Second World War 
When the Nazis came to power in 1933, Albers and his Jewish girlfriend Hansi Burg moved to Lake Starnberg in Bavaria. They married in 1934 and Albers' contract with UFA was cancelled. While Albers himself never showed public support for the Nazi regime, he became the most popular actor under Nazi rule. The actor nevertheless avoided an overly close association in public. As the ultimate sign of his popularity, the Nazis even silently accepted his relationship with Hansi Burg for a long time. But Albers finally gave in to pressure. Hansi Burg went to Switzerland and then to Great Britain in 1939, but they secretly remained a couple with him even managing to send her financial support. They were reunited after the war, when she returned to Germany in a British uniform.

In 1943, Albers was paid a huge sum of money to star in UFA's big-budgeted anniversary picture Münchhausen but was careful not to give the impression that he was endorsing the National Socialist regime, which was indeed never asked of him. Also in 1943, Albers starred in another classic German film Große Freiheit Nr. 7 with actress Ilse Werner. Some of the scenes are said to have been shot in Prague because of bomb damage to Hamburg.  The sailing ship Padua for the outdoor scenes of the film has survived under Soviet and Russian flag until this day as Kruzenshtern.

After the Second World War
After World War II Albers was affluent and, on account of his association with Hansi Burg, he avoided the financial plight and professional ban which many actors were facing at that time. Nevertheless, German "heroes" were considered undesirable by the occupation government that wanted to promote its own stars. This accounted for a major hiatus in his career and made him hard to cast. Eventually he found an opening with respectable wisdom-with-age type character parts, and enjoyed some public acclaim, but with these parts he never again enjoyed his huge stardom of the 1930s and early 1940s. By the early 1950s, his age was finally beginning to show and his powerful presence and freshness were almost wholly lost. His decline was exacerbated by his increasing alcoholism during the 1950s. Yet he remained active in movies until the very end.

Death 

Hans Albers collapsed during a theater performance with massive internal bleeding and died three months later on 24 July 1960 at a sanatorium in Kempfenhausen near Lake Starnberg at the age of 68. He was cremated and subsequently buried at the Ohlsdorf Cemetery in Hamburg, the city of his birth.

Legacy

Albers' name will forever be closely associated with his hometown of Hamburg, in particular the district of St. Pauli where there is a square named Hans-Albers-Platz in his honour. Today he is probably better known for his music than his films; many of his songs remain familiar to young German people even today.

Outside of Northern Europe, Albers remains virtually unknown; however the image of an older man in a seaman's cap and raincoat playing accordion and singing remains familiar internationally. As a case in point, McDonald's used such an image in an American television ad campaign in 1986. Albers actually had no significant experience on the water, this being restricted to a one-day trip to Heligoland.

Many of Albers' songs were humorous tales of drunken, womanizing sailors on shore-leave, with double entendres such as "It hurts the first time, but with time, you get used to it" in reference to a girl falling in love for the first time. Albers' songs were often peppered with expressions in Low German, which is spoken in Northern Germany. One of his signature songs is Auf der Reeperbahn nachts um halb eins, ("On the Reeperbahn at Half Past Midnight") which has become one of the best-known songs about Hamburg and also an unofficial anthem of the St. Pauli district where the Reeperbahn itself is located. Hans-Albers-Platz, one block south of the Reeperbahn, features a statue of Albers, created by the German artist Jörg Immendorff.

Filmography

Silent films

Sound films

Songs (selection) 
1931
 Das ist die Liebe der Matrosen (from picture Bomben auf Monte Carlo)
 Kind, du brauchst nicht weinen (from picture Der Draufgänger)
1932 
 Flieger, grüß' mit mir die Sonne (from picture F. P. 1 antwortet nicht)
 Hoppla, jetzt komm' ich (from picture Der Sieger)
 Komm' auf die Schaukel, Luise (from stage play Liliom)
 Komm und spiel mit mir (from picture Quick)
1933
 "Mein Gorilla hat 'ne Villa im Zoo" (from picture Today Is the Day)
1936
"In meinem Herzen Schatz, da ist für viele Platz" (from picture Savoy-Hotel 217)
1937
"Jawohl, meine Herrn" [with Heinz Rühmann] (from picture Der Mann, der Sherlock Holmes war)
1939
"Good bye, Jonny" (from picture Wasser für Canitoga)
1944
"La Paloma" (from picture Große Freiheit Nr. 7)
"Auf der Reeperbahn nachts um halb eins" (from picture Große Freiheit Nr. 7)
1952
"Kleine weiße Möwe" (from picture Käpt'n Bay-Bay)
"Nimm mich mit, Kapitän, auf die Reise" (from picture Käpt'n Bay-Bay)
1954
"Auf der Reeperbahn nachts um halb eins" (from picture Auf der Reeperbahn nachts um halb eins)
"Komm auf die Schaukel, Luise" (from picture Auf der Reeperbahn nachts um halb eins)
1957
"Das Herz von St. Pauli" (from picture Das Herz von St. Pauli)
1959
"Mein Junge, halt die Füße still" (from picture Dreizehn alte Esel)

Bibliography 
 Joachim Cadenbach: Hans Albers. Berlin: Universitas-Verlag, 1975, 
 Eberhard Spieß: Hans Albers. Eine Filmographie. Herausgegeben von Hilmar Hoffmann und Walter Schobert in Zusammenarbeit mit dem Deutschen Institut für Filmkunde, Wiesbaden. Verlag: Frankfurt am Main: Kommunales Kino, 1977
 Uwe-Jens Schumann: Hans Albers – seine Filme, sein Leben. (= Heyne-Filmbibliothek, Band 18) München: Heyne, 1980, 
 Hans-Christoph Blumenberg: In meinem Herzen, Schatz … Die Lebensreise des Schauspielers und Sängers Hans Albers . Frankfurt am Main: Fischer-Taschenbuch-Verlag, 1981, 
 Michaela Krützen: Hans Albers: Eine deutsche Karriere. Berlin; Weinheim: Beltz Quadriga 1995
 Michaela Krützen: „Gruppe 1: Positiv“ Carl Zuckmayers Beurteilungen über Hans Albers und Heinz Rühmann. In: Carl Zuckmayer Jahrbuch/ hg. von Günther Nickel. Göttingen 2002, S. 179-227
 Matthias Wegner: Hans Albers. Ellert & Richter, Hamburg 2005 (Hamburger Köpfe)

References

External links 

 

Photographs of Hans Albers and Bibliography
Albers at filmportal.de

1891 births
1960 deaths
Male actors from Hamburg
German male film actors
German male silent film actors
German male stage actors
Schlager musicians
Commanders Crosses of the Order of Merit of the Federal Republic of Germany
20th-century German male actors
Burials at the Ohlsdorf Cemetery
German Army personnel of World War I
Deaths from bleeding